Chandler is a city in, and the county seat of, Lincoln County, Oklahoma, United States. and is part of the Oklahoma City Metropolitan Area. The population was 3,100 at the 2010 census, an increase over the figure of 2,842 in 2000.

Chandler is located northeast of Oklahoma City on SH-66 and I-44, and north of Shawnee on SH-18.

History 
Chandler was named after Judge George Chandler, also Assistant Secretary of the Interior. The site of Chandler was opened by a land run on September 28, 1891. The town had been planned to be opened on September 22, (the date of the Land Run of 1891) but the site survey had not been completed. The Chandler Post Office had opened September 21, the day before the planned run. When Oklahoma Territory County A (Lincoln County) was organized, Chandler became the county seat.  On March 30, 1897, a tornado destroyed most of the fledgling town and killed 14 residents.

In 1891 the county government operated from an office building until a courthouse was built. The courthouse was destroyed by the tornado of 1897, and a two-story frame building was erected as a temporary courthouse on the present site. The building was removed in 1907 to make way for a stone courthouse. This third courthouse burned down on December 23, 1967 and the current courthouse was constructed in its place.

The St. Louis and Oklahoma City Railroad (later the St. Louis and San Francisco Railway, also known as the "Frisco") built a line through Chandler in 1898. The railroad enabled Chandler to move its agricultural products, as well as bricks made by the Chandler Brick Company, to markets.

Chandler is one of the many cities along the famous U.S. Route 66 and contains a number of attractions to devotees of "The Mother Road." These include The Route 66 Interpretive Center, The Oklahoma Law Enforcement Museum and Hall of Fame, The Lincoln County Museum of Pioneer History, several Route 66-themed murals, the newly restored old cottage-style Phillips 66 gas station, and one of the last remaining painted barns advertising Meramec Caverns, which is on Route 66 in Missouri.

U.S. Route 66 brought a significant amount of commercial business to Chandler, due to travelers crossing the state and the country; much of this business died out when the Turner Turnpike (Interstate 44) was built.

In 1949, the Oklahoma legislature declared Chandler to be "The pecan capital of the world," in Resolution No. 5.

In 1958, professional baseball player Bo Belcher opened Chandler Baseball Camp. For 42 years, the camp hosted campers from around the world for a bootcamp-like baseball camp during summers. The camp closed in 2000 due to the death of Tom Belcher (not to be confused with fellow baseball player Tim Belcher). In 2011 it was added to the National Register of Historic Places.

Geography

Climate

Demographics

As of the census of 2010, there were 3,100 people, 1,204 households, and 801 families residing in the city.

The population density was 389.3 people per square mile (150.3/km2). There were 1,403 housing units at an average density of 176.7 per square mile (68.2/km2). The racial makeup of the city was 79.77% White, 9.68% African American, 5.63% Native American, 0.39% Asian, 0.49% from other races, and 4.05% from two or more races. Hispanic or Latino of any race were 1.79% of the population.

Of all households, 31.2% had children under the age of 18 living with them, 47.1% were married couples living together, 14.0% had a female householder with no husband present, and 34.8% were non-families. 32.1% of all households were made up of individuals, and 17.3% had someone living alone who was 65 years of age or older. The average household size was 2.36 and the average family size was 2.98.

In the city, the population was spread out, with 25.7% under the age of 18, 8.7% from 18 to 24, 25.3% from 25 to 44, 20.7% from 45 to 64, and 19.6% who were 65 years of age or older. The median age was 38 years. For every 100 females, there were 89.8 males. For every 100 females age 18 and over, there were 84.0 males.

The median income for a household in the city was $26,833, and the median income for a family was $35,744. Males had a median income of $28,125 versus $19,397 for females. The per capita income for the city was $14,676. About 12.1% of families and 16.7% of the population were below the poverty line, including 20.3% of those under age 18 and 15.4% of those age 65 or over.

Economy 

Today, Chandler's economy is driven mostly by agriculture and livestock, oil and gas services, and manufacturing. The National American Insurance Company is headquartered in Chandler. Downtown Chandler, which is located on historic Route 66 and is home to many shops and restaurants. Lincoln County's first Wal-Mart Supercenter opened in 2008 on the east side of Chandler.

The Ioway Casino opened west of Chandler on June 1, 2013. The Ioway Casino is operated by the Iowa Tribe of Oklahoma and is the sister casino to Cimarron Casino located in Perkins. The Ioway Casino has 250 machines and is located on SH-66 between Chandler and US-177.

Recreation
Chandler is home to several city parks, a baseball complex, a splash pad, and a municipal swimming pool.  Chandler has two lakes, Bell Cow Lake, and Chandler Lake. Bell Cow Lake, which features camping, boating, fishing, and horse trails, is located north of town, along with Chandler Golf Course. The Lincoln County Raceway, a quarter mile dirt track, is located south of Chandler.

Notable people
 Thomas G. Andrews lived in Chandler where he was city attorney and also Lincoln County, Oklahoma attorney from 1922 to 1929. He later became an Associate Judge of the Oklahoma Supreme Court.
 Wade Ellis (19091989), mathematician and professor
 Jon Gray, baseball player
 Roy Harris, (18981979), composer, born in Chandler
 James C. Nance, Oklahoma community newspaper chain publisher and former Speaker of the Oklahoma House of Representatives, President pro tempore of the Oklahoma Senate and member Uniform Law Commission
 Joseph C. Pringey (18581935), politician and U.S. Representative 
 James Brooks Ayers Robertson (18711938), fourth governor of Oklahoma
 Bill Tilghman (18541924), frontier lawman

Education
Chandler and the surrounding area is served by the Chandler Public School District. The Chandler High School Alumni Association describes itself as "the oldest and most active" in the state.

Chandler High School Lions State Championships:
2016 Fast Pitch Softball State Champs
2016 Slow Pitch Softball State Champs
2015 Slow Pitch Softball State Champs
2005 Baseball State Champs
2005 Football State Champs
1998 Baseball State Champs
1998 Pom State Champs
1997 Baseball State Champs
1997 Boys Basketball State Champs
1984 Football State Champs
1972 Boys Basketball State Champs
1933 Girls Basketball State Champs

National Register of Historic Places

 Boston Store
 Chandler Armory
 Chandler Baseball Camp
 Chandler Bookstore
 Chandler High School
 Clapp-Cunningham Building
 Conklin House
 Crane Motor Company Building
 First Presbyterian Church of Chandler
 Johnson House
 Mascho Building and Public Privy (Murphy Building)
 National Guard Statistical Building
 Oleson-Crane Building
 St. Cloud Hotel
 St. Stephen's Episcopal Church
 Wolcott Building
 Midlothian School
 Seaba's Filling Station
 Spring Dell School
 Marshall William M. Tilghman Homestead

References

External links

 
 Biography of George Chandler
 Encyclopedia of Oklahoma History and Culture - Chandler
 Oklahoma Digital Maps: Digital Collections of Oklahoma and Indian Territory

Oklahoma City metropolitan area
Cities in Lincoln County, Oklahoma
Cities in Oklahoma
County seats in Oklahoma
Populated places established in 1891
1891 establishments in Oklahoma Territory